Jungle Entertainment (formerly known as Jungleboys), is a production company owned by Executive Producer Jason Burrows, Writer/Director Trent O'Donnell, Writer/Performer Phil Lloyd and Head of Production Chloe Rickard. The Sydney-based company produces television programs in Australia and the US, specializing in comedy and drama.

Productions

Awards

For comedy TV work, Jungle's Director awards include Best Comedy AFIs, Best Director at ADGA, Best Narrative Comedy at AWGIE and Best Ensemble Comedy (Equity). Jungle won Breakthrough Business of The Year at the 2013 Screen Producers Australia Awards with the comedy The Moodys being nominated for Best Comedy at the Monte Carlo TV Awards. Jungle directors have won multiple local and international advertising awards including Gold Lions at Cannes, Gold Promax, Yellow Pencil, Oneshow, Clio and AWARD awards.

References

External links
 

 
Advertising agencies of Australia
Marketing companies of Australia
Television production companies of Australia